Soap Bubbles is a 1906 French short silent film by Georges Méliès.

Plot
With smoke from a brazier, a magician makes a woman appear in midair and slowly float to the ground. Two assistants bring in an arrangement of pedestals, onto which they lead the woman. The magician blows soap bubbles through a straw, and they appear as women's faces, floating up to join the woman posing on the set of pedestals. Next they themselves change into real butterfly-winged women, before the whole tableau disappears.

Having his assistants bring on a wide plinth, the magician summons up the three women again, joining them on the plinth before they fade away. Finally, the magician curls up into a ball, becomes a giant soap bubble, and floats slowly upward. The magician returns to join his surprised assistants in a curtain call.

Production
Méliès is the magician in the film, which combines stage machinery, pyrotechnics, substitution splices, multiple exposures, and dissolves to create its illusions. The opening title card is hand-lettered as in three other films by Méliès made around the same time: Rip's Dream (1905), The Tramp and the Mattress Makers (1906), and The Witch (1906).

Méliès's final trick, curling into a fetal position and disappearing into the womb of the bubble, is reminiscent of his later film The Knight of Black Art (1907), in which he disappears into a large hoop. In both cases, he returns at the end of the film to reassure his frightened assistants.

Release and legacy
Soap Bubbles was sold by Méliès's Star Film Company and is numbered 846–848 in its catalogues. At his stage venue, the Théâtre Robert-Houdin, Méliès did a magic act between 1907 and 1910 developing the soap-bubble motif from the film. In the stage act, a ghost slept on a stool, with huge soap bubbles come out of his head as he snored. Three such bubbles floated around the stage, and three phosphorescent ghostly heads appeared inside them.

References

External links
 

French black-and-white films
Films directed by Georges Méliès
French silent short films